SkyscraperPage is a website for skyscraper hobbyists and enthusiasts that tracks existing and proposed skyscrapers around the world. The site is owned by Skyscraper Source Media, a supplier of skyscraper diagrams for the publication, marketing, and display industries, and is a publisher of illustrated skyscraper diagram poster products. They are based in Victoria, British Columbia.

The site has over 60,000 drawings of skyscrapers, other major macro-engineering projects, and tall structures around the world.  The scale of the drawings are one pixel per meter. The images are created using pixel art. Using these diagrams, skyscrapers and other tall structures can be compared. General information is also given about each structure if available, such as the location, the year built, the height and the number of floors.

The site also hosts a discussion forum for skyscraper enthusiasts.

See also 
 SkyscraperCity
 Emporis
 List of Internet forums
 List of tallest buildings in the world
 Structurae
 Council on Tall Buildings and Urban Habitat

References 

Internet forums
Online databases
Skyscrapers

External links
 SkyscraperPage